Ruffner is a surname. Notable people with the surname include:

Clark L. Ruffner (1903–1982), U.S. Army general
Frederick Gale Ruffner Jr. (1926–2014), American publisher
Ginny Ruffner (born 1952), American glass artist 
Henry Ruffner (1790–1861), American educator and Presbyterian minister
Jessica Ruffner, American comics colorist
Mason Ruffner (born 1947), American blues and rock singer, guitarist and songwriter
Paul Ruffner (1948–2022), American basketball player 
Viola Ruffner (1812–1903), American schoolteacher